Eigerwand is a currently disused underground railway station on the Jungfrau railway, which runs to the Jungfraujoch from Kleine Scheidegg. The station is situated just behind the north wall of the Eiger, and its principal purpose was to allow passengers to observe the view through a series of windows carved into the rock face. Trains to Jungfraujoch used to stop at the station for five minutes.

However, since late 2016, after the introduction of new, faster, rolling stock, the Jungfraubahn no longer stops here. Indeed, much of the 2017 publicity material fails to acknowledge that this viewpoint station ever existed.

The station opened on 28 June 1903, with the extension of the Jungfraubahn from its previous temporary terminus at Rotstock station. After further construction, the line was extended to Eismeer station on 25 July 1905, and Eigerwand became an intermediate stop.

Administratively, the station is in the municipality of Grindelwald in the canton of Bern. However, the only access to the station other than by train is a door in the sheer face of the mountain. This has, on occasion, been used to rescue mountaineers stranded on the mountain, most famously during the 1936 Eiger north face climbing disaster.

It also lies right next to the Stollenloch, an exit and unofficial stop which is typically used by mountaineers to bypass the lower approach of the North Face.

Prior to its closure, the following passenger trains operated:

See also 
 List of highest railway stations in Switzerland

References

External links 
 

Railway stations in Switzerland opened in 1903
Railway stations in the canton of Bern
Eiger